Jüri Kerem (24 April 1943 – 8 September 1993) was an Estonian caricaturist and portraitist.

He was born in Tallinn.

References

External links
Some of Jüri Kerem's works (choose his name from the menu on the right)

Estonian caricaturists
Portrait artists
Estonian illustrators
People from Tallinn
1943 births
1993 deaths
Tallinn University alumni